Vladimir Eduardo Loroña Aguilar (born 16 November 1998) is a Mexican professional footballer who plays as a right-back for Liga MX club Tigres UANL.

International career
Loroña participated at the 2020 CONCACAF Olympic Qualifying Championship, appearing in three matches, where Mexico won the competition. He was subsequently called up to participate in the 2020 Summer Olympics. Loroña won the bronze medal with the Olympic team.

Career statistics

Club

Honours
Mexico U23
CONCACAF Olympic Qualifying Championship: 2020
Olympic Bronze Medal: 2020

References

External links
 
 
 
 

1998 births
Living people
Association football defenders
Club Puebla players
Club Tijuana footballers
Tigres UANL footballers
Liga MX players
Tercera División de México players
Footballers from Sonora
People from Caborca
Footballers at the 2020 Summer Olympics
Olympic footballers of Mexico
Olympic medalists in football
Olympic bronze medalists for Mexico
Medalists at the 2020 Summer Olympics
Mexican footballers